Vangelis Nastos (born 13 September 1980) is a Greek former football defender who last played for Veria in the Greek Super League.

Club career
Nastos is a youth product of PAOK FC and had contract with the club of Thessaloniki from 1996 to 2003. In the meantime he had played for AEL and Kalamata on loan.
Nastos previously played for Perugia Calcio, Vicenza Calcio and Ascoli Calcio in Serie B. His contract with Atromitos wasn't renewed and so the player was released by the club on 30 June 2015. He played six consecutive seasons for the club and he made a total of 117 appearances scoring six times. On 6 August 2015, he signed to Veria for a year. Nastos debuted on 23 August 2015 against PAS Giannina. On 1 July 2016, he retired from professional football.

Honours
Greek Cup
 Winner (1): 2003
 Runners-up (2): 2011, 2012

References

1980 births
Living people
Footballers from Thessaloniki
Greek footballers
Greece under-21 international footballers
Kalamata F.C. players
PAOK FC players
Ascoli Calcio 1898 F.C. players
A.C. Perugia Calcio players
L.R. Vicenza players
Atromitos F.C. players
Veria F.C. players
Association football defenders
Serie A players
Serie B players
Expatriate footballers in Italy
Greek expatriate footballers
Greek expatriate sportspeople in Italy
Super League Greece players